The 2006 France rugby union tour of Romania and South Africa was a series of matches played in June 2006 in Romania and South Africa by France national rugby union team.

Results

Romania: 15. Florin Vlaicu, 14. Catalin Fercu, 13. Catalin Dascalu, 12. Romeo Gontineac, 11. Ion Teodorescu, 10. Ionut Dimofte, 9. Lucian Sirbu, 8. Cosmin Ratiu, 7. Alex Tudori, 6. Stelian Burcea, 5. Cristian Petre, 4. Sorin Socol (c), 3. Bogdan Balan, 2. Marius Tincu, 1. Petru Balan, – Replacements: 16. Cezar Popescu, 17. Paulica Ion, 18. Razvan Mavrodin, 19. Valentin Ursache, 20. Valentin Calafeteanu, 21. Gabriel Brezoianu, 22. Iulian Dumitras 
France: 15. Clément Poitrenaud, 14. Philippe Bidabé, 13. Yannick Jauzion, 12. Damien Traille, 11. Cédric Heymans, 10. Thomas Castaignède, 9. Pierre Mignoni, 8. Julien Bonnaire, 7. Rémy Martin, 6. Thierry Dusautoir, 5. Fabien Pelous (c), 4. Lionel Nallet, 3. David Attoub, 2. Raphaël Ibañez, 1. Sylvain Marconnet, – Replacements: 16. Dimitri Szarzewski, 17. Vincent Debaty, 18. Jérôme Thion, 19. Imanol Harinordoquy, 21. David Marty, 22. Julien Laharrague – Unused: 20. Dimitri Yachvili

South Africa: 15. Percy Montgomery, 14. Brent Russell, 13. Wynand Olivier, 12. De Wet Barry, 11. Bryan Habana, 10. Jaco van der Westhuyzen, 9. Fourie du Preez, 8. Pedrie Wannenburg, 7. Juan Smith, 6. Joe van Niekerk, 5. Victor Matfield, 4. Danie Rossouw, 3. Eddie Andrews, 2. John Smit (c), 1. Os du Randt, – Replacements: 17. CJ van der Linde, 19. Jacques Cronjé, 20. Ricky Januarie, 21. Wayne Julies, 22. Gaffie du Toit – Unused: 16. Gary Botha, 18. Albert van den Berg
France: 15. Julien Laharrague, 14. Vincent Clerc, 13. Florian Fritz, 12. Yannick Jauzion, 11. Cédric Heymans, 10. Damien Traille, 9. Dimitri Yachvili, 8. Imanol Harinordoquy, 7. Thierry Dusautoir, 6. Serge Betsen, 5. Jérôme Thion, 4. Fabien Pelous (c), 3. Pieter de Villiers, 2. Dimitri Szarzewski, 1. Sylvain Marconnet, – Replacements: 16. Raphaël Ibañez, 18. Lionel Nallet, 19. Julien Bonnaire, 20. Rémy Martin, 22. Thomas Castaignède – Unused: 17. Vincent Debaty, 21. Pierre Mignoni

References

Notes

2006 rugby union tours
2005–06 in French rugby union
2006
2006
2005–06 in Romanian rugby union
2006 in South African rugby union
2006